Waleed Bakshween (born 12 November 1989) is a Saudi professional footballer who plays as a defensive midfielder for Pro League club Al-Wehda and the Saudi Arabia national team.

Honours

Club 
Al-Ahli
Winner
 King Cup of Champions: 2011, 2012, 2016
 Saudi Crown Prince Cup: 2014–15
 Saudi Professional League: 2015–16
 Saudi Super Cup: 2016

Runner-up
 Saudi Professional League: 2011–12, 2014–15
 AFC Champions League: 2012
 King Cup of Champions: 2014
 Saudi Crown Prince Cup: 2015-16

References

External links 
 

1989 births
Living people
Saudi Arabian footballers
Al-Ahli Saudi FC players
Al-Wehda Club (Mecca) players
Saudi Arabia international footballers
Association football midfielders
Saudi Arabian people of Yemeni descent
2015 AFC Asian Cup players
Sportspeople from Jeddah
Saudi Professional League players
Saudi First Division League players